Philinopsis taronga is a species of small and colorful aglajid sea slug, a shell-less opisthobranch gastropod mollusk in the family Aglajidae. It has an Indo-Pacific distribution in southeastern Australia and northern New Zealand.

References

Further reading
 Powell A. W. B., New Zealand Mollusca, William Collins Publishers Ltd, Auckland, New Zealand 1979 
  Burn R. (2006) A checklist and bibliography of the Opisthobranchia (Mollusca: Gastropoda) of Victoria and the Bass Strait area, south-eastern Australia. Museum Victoria Science Reports 10:1–42

Aglajidae
Gastropods of New Zealand
Molluscs of the Indian Ocean
Molluscs of the Pacific Ocean
Gastropods described in 1933